Gar Mandaran (গড় মান্দারন) is a village and a gram panchayat in the Goghat II CD block in the Arambag subdivision of the Hooghly district in the state of West Bengal, India.

Overview
The ruins of a fort at Gar Mandaran provided the setting for Bankim Chandra Chatterjee’s novel Durgeshnandini.

Durgeshnandini is a romantic novel, based partly on history and partly on hearsay. The story centres around the attack and occupation of Gar Mandaran stronghold of Raja Birendra Singh, linked to the Bishnupur Raj, by the Pathans who were then entrenched in Odisha. The Mughal general Man Singh's son, Jagat Singh, was despatched to keep the Pathans at bay. Jagat Singh fell in love with Tilottama, the beautiful daughter of Raja Birendra Singh. The Pathans captured the fort, killed Raja Birendra Singh and held Jagat Singh and Tilottama, but a fatal attack on the Pathan general Kotlu Khan, turned things around.

Durgeshnandini, published in 1865, took the literary world by storm and was considered an epoch-making novel. It went through 13 editions during Bankim Chandra's life-time.

Geography

Area overview
The Arambagh subdivision, presented in the map alongside, is divided into two physiographic parts – the Dwarakeswar River being the dividing line. The western part is upland and rocky – it is extension of the terrain of neighbouring Bankura district. The eastern part is flat alluvial plain area.  The railways, the roads and flood-control measures have had an impact on the area. The area is overwhelmingly rural with 94.77% of the population living in rural areas and 5.23% of the population living in urban areas.

Note: The map alongside presents some of the notable locations in the subdivision. All places marked in the map are linked in the larger full screen map.

Location

History
Around the time when Bakhtiyar Khilji (1204–1206) came to Bengal, the region was divided into five parts – Rarh, Bagri, Vanga, Barendra, and Mithila. Vanga was further subdivided into three parts – Lakhanabati, Subarnagram and Saptagram. The fort of Mandaran was under the control of Gajapati Kapilendra Deva of Odisha but was lost to Bengal Sultan later. The  ruler of the then Bengal, Hussain Saha was surrounded by forces of Gajapati Prataprudra Deva in this fort when he was chased down by Odia forces just after his raid into Odisha.When the frontiers of Bengal were expanded during Mughal rule, there were three prominent administrative zones in the Saptagram area – Sirkar Satgaon, Sirkar Selimabad and Sirkar Mandaran. The tomb of warrior Shah Ismail Ghazi is situated in the mound of Gar Mandaran.

Demographics
According to the 2011 Census of India, Gar Mandaran had a total population of 6,264 of which 3,242 (52%) were males and 3,022 (48%) were females. Population in the age range 0–6 years was 734. The total number of literate persons in Gar Mandaran was 4,100 (74.14% of the population over 6 years).

Transport
Gar Mandaran is on Kamarpukur-Gar Mandaran-Kajla road. It is 2 km from Kamarpukur.

Education
Gar Mandaran High School is a Bengali-medium co-educational institution. It was established in 1944.

References

External links
 

Villages in Hooghly district